This is a list of episodes for the television series The New WKRP in Cincinnati.

Series overview

Episodes

Season 1 (1991–92)

Season 2 (1992–93)

External links
 

New WKRP in Cincinnati
WKRP (2) episodes